Parliamentary elections were held in Uzbekistan on 26 December 2004, with a second round on 9 January 2005. The Uzbekistan Liberal Democratic Party won the most seats.

Results

References

Uzbekistan
Uzbekistan
Parliamentary election
Parliamentary election
Elections in Uzbekistan
Election and referendum articles with incomplete results